The Jackofficers was a short-lived side project started by Gibby Haynes and Jeff Pinkus of the Butthole Surfers. They released their only album, Digital Dump, in 1990 and disbanded the same year following a brief club tour that found them simply hitting play on a Sony Walkman and standing there while it played.  The music consisted entirely of samples manipulated and mixed on early computer software and f/x.  Samples range from Jimi Hendrix spoken words to The Texas Chain Saw Massacre. The Chicago Tribune wrote: "Sounding somewhere between industrial dance such as Ministry and Herbie Hancock, this stuff is OK if you want to dance in a dump." Spin called it "mega-brilliant weirdness." The Washington Post stated that the album is "a little funkier, and a little funnier, than most industrial."

Digital Dump -- Track listing
"Love-O-Maniac" – 3:05
"Time Machines Pt. 1" – 4:57
"Time Machines Pt. 2" – 4:05
"L.A. Mama Peanut Butter" – 3:28
"Do It" – 3:20
"Swingers Club" – 4:18
"Ventricular Refibulation" – 4:03
"#6" – 2:44
"Don't Touch That" – 3:09
"An Hawaiian Christmas Song" – 3:33
"Flush" – 1:21

References

Butthole Surfers
American experimental musical groups
Rough Trade Records artists
1990 debut albums